King Dork Approximately is a 2014 Young Adult Novel by Frank Portman. It is a sequel to his 2006 debut novel King Dork. The paperback edition contained a link to a free download of the companion album King Dork Approximately, The Album.

References

2014 American novels
Books by Frank Portman
American young adult novels
Sequel novels
Novels set in the San Francisco Bay Area
Delacorte Press books